Coniston is a cattle station in the  Northern Territory of Australia in central Australia and is located about 250 kilometres north-west of Alice Springs,

Coniston is best known as the site of the Coniston massacre, which was the last known massacre of Indigenous Australians, in August 1928.  Owing to a severe drought, the original owners (the Warlpiri, Anmatyerre, and Kaytetye people ) gravitated towards their ancient water sources, which the pastoralists were using for their livestock. Conflicts soon arose.

Coniston is still a working cattle station, and has been featured by the Northern Territory government for its introduction of a 6.4 kW solar power station. Developed in 1923 by Randall Stafford because of a sustainable water supply, the station still thrives today.

Coniston Station has been owned and managed by Max Lines and his wife Jacqui  for more than three decades. In 2014,  Max Lines found himself bedbound. With the help of her family and loyal staff, Jacqui continued to run the property.

See also
List of ranches and stations

References 

Pastoral leases in the Northern Territory
Stations (Australian agriculture)